Events in the year 1881 in Brazil.

Incumbents
Monarch – Pedro II
Prime Minister – José Antônio Saraiva

Events

 9 January: Saraiva Law comes into effect after being passed on the Senate on 4 January.

Births

Deaths

References

 
1880s in Brazil
Years of the 19th century in Brazil
Brazil
Brazil